Ongota (also known as Birale, Birayle) is a moribund language of southwest Ethiopia. UNESCO reported in 2012 that out of a total ethnic population of 115, only 12 elderly native speakers remained, the rest of their small village on the west bank of the Weito River having adopted the Tsamai language instead.  The default word order is subject–object–verb. The classification of the language is obscure (Sava & Tosco 2015).

History of the people

Oral history of the Ongota tells that they originated from a number of different populations from Dikinte, Maale and Arbore among others. During a stay in Maale territory, which today lies at their north, the collection of clans were chased south due to their hunting of Maale livestock. They followed the banks of the Weito River until they reached the Arbore, where they were turned away back north and settled where they are today. This account differs from that of the Maale, who claim that the Ongota were originally a part of the Maale who migrated and did not return.

Classification
Ongota has features of both Afroasiatic and Nilo-Saharan languages that confuse its classification, and linguists and anthropologists have been unable to clearly trace its linguistic roots so far. Savà and Tosco (2007) claim that Ongota's morphology is Ts'amakko and that ~50% of the lexicon can be connected to Ts'amakko roots. They also report that Aklilu Yilma of Addis Ababa University considers Ongota to be a pidginised creole. They state that this "conclusion is strengthened by a local legend stating that Ongota originated from a multiethnic melting pot."  They further report that Lionel Bender considers Ongota to be Cushitic, Václav Blažek (1991, 2001, and forth.) Nilo-Saharan, and Cushiticist Maarten Mous (2003) mentions it as a language isolate. Savà and Tosco (2003, 2007), themselves, believe it to be an East Cushitic language with a Nilo-Saharan substratum—that is, that Ongota speakers shifted to East Cushitic from an earlier Nilo-Saharan language, traces of which still remain. Fleming (2006) considers it to be an independent branch of Afroasiatic. Bonny Sands (2009) believes Savà and Tosco's proposal to be the most convincing proposal. Sava & Tosco (2015) leave it unclassified, possibly an isolate but possibly so affected by superstrate influence that the original affiliation of the language has been obscured.

Decline
The main mechanism behind the decline of Ongota is marriage with other communities. In a brief expedition in the early 1990s, a number of researchers made the observation that many Ongota men married Tsamakko women. The child would grow up speaking only the mother's language, but not the father's. (Mikesh, P. et al., 1992–1993) This trend has continued through the recent years.

See also
Ongota word list (Wiktionary)
Shabo language
South Omo

References

Bibliography
 Fleming, Harold, 2002.  "Ongota Lexicon: English-Ongota".  Mother Tongue, VII, pp. 39–65.
 Fleming, Harold, 2006. Ongota: A Decisive Language in African Prehistory. – Wiesbaden : Harrassowitz. 
 Mikesh, P. et al., 1992–1993. "Ongota or Birale: a moribund language of Gemu-Gofa (Ethiopia)". Journal of Afroasiatic Languages, 3,3:181–225.
 Militarev, Alexander, 2005. “Towards the genetic affiliation of Ongota, a nearly-‐extinct language of Ethiopia.” In ""Memoriae Igor M. Diakonoff"", by Leonin E. Kogan, (pp. 567-‐607). Winona Lake: Eisenbrauns.
 Sands, Bonny (2009). "Africa’s Linguistic Diversity". Language and Linguistics Compass 3/2 (2009): 559–580, 10.1111/j.1749-818x.2008.00124.x
 Savà, Graziano, 2003. “Ongota (Birale), a Moribund Language of Southwest Ethiopia.” In ""Language Death and Language Maintenance: Theoretical, Practical and Descriptive Approaches"" by M. Janse, S. Tol, & V. Hendriks. Amsterdam: Benjamins.
 Savà, Graziano and Mauro Tosco 2000. A sketch of Ongota, a dying language of southwest Ethiopia. Studies in African Linguistics 29.2.59–136.
 Savà, Graziano and Mauro Tosco 2003. "The classification of Ongota". In Bender et al. eds, Selected comparative-historical Afrasian linguistic studies. LINCOM Europa.
 Savà, Graziano and Mauro Tosco 2007. Review article: HAROLD C. FLEMING, Ongota: a Decisive Language in African Prehistory. Aethiopica 10.
 Savà, Graziano and Mauro Tosco 2015. The Ongota language – and two ways of looking at the history of the marginal and hunting-gathering peoples of East Africa. Rivista annuale dell’associazione Ethnorêma XI - N. 11, pp. 1–18. open access
 Savà, Graziano, & Thubauville, Sophia, 2010. “The Ongota : a branch of the Maale? ; ethnographic, historic and linguistic traces of contact of the Ongota people.” In "To live with others: essays on cultural neighborhood in southern Ethiopia", edited by E. Gabbert, & S. Thubauville, (pp. 213‐235). Koln: Koppe.

External links
 Ongota entry in the Endangered Languages Project
 A short preview of a film with spoken Ongota by Robert Weijs
 A socio-linguistic survey that includes a wordlist of Ongota
 Another Ongota worldist by the Rosetta Project
 A news article metaphorically extends language death from Ongota to radio 
 Mauro Tosco's Ongota entry (in the Encyclopaedia Aethiopica)
 Mauro Tosco presenting paper on Ongota as an isolate
 Documentation of Ongota in Endangered Languages Archive (deposited by Graziano Savà)

 
Afroasiatic languages
Languages of Ethiopia
Endangered languages of Africa
Language isolates of Africa
Endangered Afroasiatic languages
Endangered language isolates
Subject–object–verb languages